Mykhaylo Kopolovets (born 29 January 1984) is a Ukrainian former professional football midfielder who is most known for playing for  Zakarpattia Uzhhorod, Karpaty Lviv and Mynai.

Career statistics

External links
 Profile on Official Karpaty Lviv Website
 
 
 

1984 births
Living people
Ukrainian footballers
Ukrainian Premier League players
Ukrainian First League players
Ukrainian Second League players
Ukrainian Amateur Football Championship players
Belarusian Premier League players
NOFV-Oberliga players
FC Karpaty Lviv players
FC Hoverla Uzhhorod players
FC Zakarpattia-2 Uzhhorod players
FC Belshina Bobruisk players
FC Einheit Rudolstadt players
FC Mynai players
Expatriate footballers in Belarus
Ukrainian expatriate footballers
Expatriate footballers in Germany
Ukrainian expatriate sportspeople in Belarus
Ukrainian expatriate sportspeople in Germany
Association football midfielders
Sportspeople from Zakarpattia Oblast